Greg Ellis may refer to:

Greg Ellis (actor) (born 1968), English actor
Greg Ellis (American football) (born 1975), American football player
Greg Ellis (musician), American musician, member of VAS and Roseland
Greg Ellis (rugby league), Australian rugby league footballer